Pryberezhne is a Ukrainian place name that can refer to the following localities:

Urban-type settlements
 Pryberezhne, Donetsk Oblast

Villages
 Pryberezhne, Saky Raion, Crimea
 Pryberezhne, Sudak Municipality, Crimea
 Pryberezhne, Vinnytsia Oblast
 Pryberezhne, Zhytomyr Oblast

Rural settlements
 Pryberezhne, Odesa Oblast